The Lester Depot, also known as Northern Pacific Depot, was a railway station building located in Lester, Washington which was listed on the National Register of Historic Places in 1987.
 
It was built in 1886.
 
The building was torn down by the Burlington Northern railroad in 1992.

See also
 National Register of Historic Places listings in King County, Washington

References

1992 disestablishments in Washington (state)
Buildings and structures demolished in 1992
Former Northern Pacific Railway stations in Washington (state)
National Register of Historic Places in King County, Washington
Railway stations on the National Register of Historic Places in Washington (state)